Trzciana may refer to the following places:
Trzciana, Lesser Poland Voivodeship (south Poland)
Trzciana, Krosno County in Subcarpathian Voivodeship (south-east Poland)
Trzciana, Mielec County in Subcarpathian Voivodeship (south-east Poland)
Trzciana, Rzeszów County in Subcarpathian Voivodeship (south-east Poland)
Trzciana, West Pomeranian Voivodeship (north-west Poland)